Timothy Lyle Crabtree (born October 13, 1969) is a former Major League Baseball pitcher for the Toronto Blue Jays and Texas Rangers from  to . 

He was later signed by four teams as a free agent from 2002 to 2005, although never appeared in the major leagues again.

External links

Pelota Binaria (Venezuelan Winter League)

1969 births
Living people
American expatriate baseball players in Canada
Arizona League Rangers players
Baseball players from Michigan
Cardenales de Lara players
American expatriate baseball players in Venezuela
Frisco RoughRiders players
Huntsville Stars players
Knoxville Blue Jays players
Knoxville Smokies players
Major League Baseball pitchers
Michigan State Spartans baseball players
Oklahoma RedHawks players
Sportspeople from Jackson, Michigan
St. Catharines Blue Jays players
St. Catharines Stompers players
Syracuse Chiefs players
Syracuse SkyChiefs players
Texas Rangers players
Toronto Blue Jays players
Tulsa Drillers players
Vero Beach Dodgers players